Manouk Gijsman (born 29 September 1992 in Leiderdorp) is a Dutch former competitive figure skater. She is a three-time Dutch national champion and reached the free skate at three ISU Championships – 2009 Europeans in Helsinki, 2010 Junior Worlds in The Hague, and 2010 Worlds in Turin.

Programs

Competitive highlights
JGP: Junior Grand Prix

References

External links 

 
 Manouk Gijsman at Tracings.net

1992 births
Living people
Dutch female single skaters
Sportspeople from Alphen aan den Rijn
People from Leiderdorp
20th-century Dutch women
21st-century Dutch women